Siah Siah-ye Habib (also Romanized as Sīāh Sīāh-ye Ḩabīb; also known as Sīā Sīā Jīb, Sīā Sīā-ye Ḩabīb, and Sīyā Sīyā) is a village in Howmeh-ye Jonubi Rural District, in the Central District of Eslamabad-e Gharb County, Kermanshah Province, Iran. At the 2006 census, its population was 84, in 17 families.

References 

Populated places in Eslamabad-e Gharb County